Celeribacter marinus is a Gram-negative, rod-shaped and non-motile bacterium from the genus of Celeribacter which has been isolated from seawater from the Yellow Sea in Korea.

References

Rhodobacteraceae
Bacteria described in 2014